Forest Nenets is a Samoyedic language spoken in northern Russia, around the Agan, Pur, Lyamin and Nadym rivers, by the Nenets people. It is closely related to the Tundra Nenets language, and the two are still sometimes seen as simply being dialects of a single Nenets language, despite there being low mutual intelligibility between the two. The next closest relatives are Nganasan and Enets, after them Selkup, and even more distantly the other Uralic languages.

Phonology

Vowels 
In stressed syllables, the vowel phonemes of the Forest Nenets dialect are:

In unstressed syllables length is not contrastive, and there are only five vowel qualities: . Word stress is not fixed to a certain position of a root; this leads to alternations of stressed mid vowels with unstressed high vowels. Long vowels are slightly more common than short vowels, though only short vowels occur in monosyllabic words. The short mid vowels  are marginal, occurring only in a small number of monosyllabic words and commonly merged into the corresponding high vowels . This is additionally complicated by the short high vowels  becoming lowered to  before . Because of this, Salminen (2007) argued that the long vowels should be considered the basic and the short vowels the marked phonemes.

Short  is usually  (and is also written as ай, though this spelling also represents the sequence ), but alternates with its long counterpart in the same way as the other short vowels.

Reduced vowel 
Forest Nenets and its sister dialect, Tundra Nenets, have long been thought to have a so-called "reduced vowel". This reduced vowel was thought to have had two distinct qualities depending on whether or not it was subject to stress in the word or not. Recent developments indicate, however, that the reduced vowels are in fact short vowels which act as counterparts to their respective long vowels.

Consonants

Forest Nenets has a system of 24 consonant phonemes:

Voicing is not contrastive, but most consonants contrast palatalization.

A rhotic consonant  may appear in recent loanwords. Older ,  have recently shifted to lateral fricatives , . 

The palatalized alveolars ,  are typically realized as alveolo-palatals , .

Orthography 

Nenets is written with an adapted form of Cyrillic, incorporating the supplemental letters Ӈ, ʼ, and ˮ.

References 

Nenets languages
Northern Samoyedic languages